Fabrizio Palermo was born in Perugia February 5, 1971. Palermo was Chief Executive Officer and General Manager of Cassa depositi e prestiti S.p.A. (CDP) and is currently the CEO of Acea.

Education

Fabrizio Palermo graduated with honors in Business and Economics from La Sapienza University in Rome in 1994.

Career 
He began his career in 1995, in the Investment Banking Division at Morgan Stanley in London, where he was responsible for equity and bond placements, corporate mergers and acquisitions.

From 1998 until 2005, he was a strategic consultant at McKinsey & Company, specialising in corporate restructuring, transformation and turnaround projects for major industrial and financial groups. 

In 2005, he joined the Fincantieri Group as Business Development and Corporate Finance Director, reporting to the CEO, before taking on the role of Chief Financial Officer (2006-2014) and then Deputy General Manager (2011-2014).

From 2014 to 2018, he was Chief Financial Officer and Financial Reporting Officer at Cassa depositi e prestiti Group, with responsibility for postal and bond funding, liquidity management, investment portfolio management and Group Asset and Liability Management (ALM). 

He was CEO of CDP RETI S.p.A from 2019 to 2021 and Co-Chairman of the Italy-China Business Forum.

On 26 September 2022, he was appointed Chief executive officer of Acea.

Appointments 
He was Chairman of the Board of Directors of CDP Equity S.p.A from December 2018 to Aprile 2019. He is also on the board of Fincantieri S.p.A. and Open Fiber S.p.A., and a member of the Fondo Atlante investor committee. 
Since 2017, he has been a member of the Italian-French committee for the alliance project between Fincantieri and the Naval Group, a European shipbuilder. Since 2018 he has been a board member of Centro Studi Americani. 

On 27 July 2018, he was appointed CEO of Cassa depositi e prestiti, on 4 October 2018, he also took up the position of General Manager. He has also served as a board member of Fincantieri USA Inc., Vard Group AS, Vard Holdings Limited, Risparmio Holding S.p.A. and Equam S.p.A. and as a member of the Italian Recovery Fund (formerly Atlante II) investor committee.

Since 2020 Fabrizio Palermo has been a board member of Assonime, as well as a member of the Advisory Board of the Italian Presidency of the B20.

See also
 Cassa depositi e prestiti

References 

Italian chief executives
Sapienza University of Rome alumni
Chief financial officers
1971 births
Living people